Glynarthen is a small village located in Ceredigion, Wales. It is part of the community of Penbryn, along with the neighbouring villages of Brynhoffnant, Sarnau and Tan-y-groes.

Ysgol Glynarthen School was a primary school situated in the village. It was built in 1901 and closed in 2012, with its pupils then attending Ysgol T Llew Jones School in nearby Brynhoffnant.

The school's unison party won their category in the Urdd Gobaith Cymru Eisteddfod in the Cardiff Millennium Centre in May 2009.

There is a mother chapel in the village which hosts the annual Easter Cymanfa. There is also an active Sunday school.

References

Villages in Ceredigion